The Dubai Sevens is an annual rugby sevens and social event held at The Sevens Stadium in Dubai, UAE. Founded in 1970, the event is the longest running sports event in the Middle East.

Events

The Dubai Sevens has four competitions each year:
 World Rugby Sevens Series
 World Rugby Women's Sevens Series
 Rugby Invitation Tournament 
 Netball Invitation Tournament

Dubai is the first leg of the World Rugby Sevens Series. Sixteen teams compete in the men's tournament divided into four pool of four teams. On the first day, each team plays the other three teams in the pool. The two highest teams in each pool advance to the quarterfinal knockout rounds, and the bottom two teams move to the challenge bracket.

Dubai also hosts a stop on the World Rugby Women's Sevens Series. Twelve teams compete in the women's tournament.

For the invitation tournaments, rugby teams take part in 15 sections.  The rugby invitational tournament is popular, with hundreds of teams participating. The netball tournament includes teams in three sections: gulf women, open youth, and open women.

The Dubai Sevens is one of the more popular sporting events in Dubai, with over 100,000 fans attending the 2016 event.

Venue
The Dubai Sevens has been held at The Sevens Stadium since 2008. Facilities at The Sevens include: eight rugby pitches, six cricket pitches, four netball/tennis courts, one basketball court, a grandstand, and ancillary facilities.

The tournament's move to that venue in 2008 was a success. The tournament broke the World Series single-day attendance record in its first year with over 50,000 fans appearing on the first day of the tournament.

World Series results

Summary of results
Five teams have won the Dubai Sevens at least once. The early years of the tournament on the World Series were less competitive. Prior to 2003, New Zealand won the final with a comfortable 20+ point margin each year. In the first decade from 1999 to 2008 only five teams (New Zealand, Fiji, Samoa, South Africa, and England) had reached the Dubai Sevens final. Since then, the tournament has been more competitive, with several additional teams making the final and semifinal stages.

Summary of Dubai Sevens results on the World Series (updated to 2022):

Results by year

Notes: The event held on November 7–8, 2001, was downgraded in status and excluded from the Sevens World Series after several teams withdrew in the wake of the September 11, 2001 attacks.

Earlier winners
Winners of the Emirates International Trophy from 1988 to 1998:

1988 London Scottish
1989 Crawshays
1990 Toulouse
1991 Queensland
1992 
1993 White Hart Marauders
1994 
1995 Kiwi Nomads
1996 
1997 New Zealand Invitation
1998

See also
 Dubai Women's Sevens

References

External links
 Official website

 

 
World Rugby Sevens Series tournaments
The Emirates Group
International rugby union competitions hosted by the United Arab Emirates
Rugby sevens competitions in Asia
Rugby union in Dubai
Recurring sporting events established in 1988
1988 establishments in the United Arab Emirates